Redcliff was a provincial electoral district in Alberta, Canada, mandated to return a single member to the Legislative Assembly of Alberta from 1913 to 1926.

History
The Redcliff electoral district was formed prior to the 1913 Alberta general election from the Medicine Hat, Lethbridge District and Gleichen electoral districts.
The Redcliff electoral district derived its name from the Town of Redcliff, Alberta.

The Redcliff electoral district was dissolved prior to the 1926 Alberta general election, and formed the new Empress electoral district.

Members of the Legislative Assembly (MLAs)

Electoral history

1913 general election

1917 general election

1921 general election

See also
List of Alberta provincial electoral districts
Redcliff, Alberta, a town in southeastern Alberta, Canada

References

Further reading

External links
Elections Alberta
The Legislative Assembly of Alberta

Former provincial electoral districts of Alberta